Richard "Ritchie" Buckle (born 20 February 1960 from Dover, Kent) is a former English professional darts player, who played in Professional Darts Corporation events. He was nickname Uncle Fester.

Career
Buckle qualified for the 2004 PDC World Darts Championship, who defeating at the Last 48 to Jan van der Rassel of Netherlands and Steve Brown of United States in the Last 40, but he lost at the Last 32 stage to Dennis Priestley of England.

Buckle quit the PDC in 2009.

World Championship performances

PDC
 2004: Last 32: (lost to Dennis Priestley 3–4) (sets)

References

External links

1960 births
Living people
English darts players
Professional Darts Corporation associate players
Sportspeople from Dover, Kent